Ku-ring-gai, an electoral district of the Legislative Assembly in the Australian state of New South Wales, was created in 1973 and has always been held by the Liberal Party.


Members for Ku-ring-gai

Election results

Elections in the 2010s

2019

2015

2011

Elections in the 2000s

2007

2003

Elections in the 1990s

1999

1995

1992 by-election

1991

Elections in the 1980s

1988

1984

1981

1980 by-election

Elections in the 1970s

1978

1976

1973

Notes

References

New South Wales state electoral results by district